The Bear and the Nightingale is a historical fantasy novel written by Katherine Arden. It is Arden's debut novel, and the first novel in the Winternight trilogy. The Bear and the Nightingale is set in medieval Russia and incorporates elements of Russian folklore. The central character is a young girl, Vasya Petrovna, who is able to communicate with mythological creatures, at a time when Orthodox Christianity is attempting to stamp out all belief in such beings.

The Bear and the Nightingale was a finalist for the Locus Award, and Arden received nominations for the John W. Campbell Award. The full trilogy was a finalist for the Hugo Award for Best Series.

Synopsis

Plot 
The novel begins with an introduction of Pyotr Vladimirovich's household. Pyotr is a Russian boyar, the lord of a remote village, Lesnaya Zemlya, on the outskirts of the forests. His wife, Marina Ivanovna, the daughter of the Grand Prince of Moscow, Ivan I, and their four children, Kolya, Sasha, Olga and Alyosha are huddled around the kitchen oven being told the story of the frost-demon by their housekeeper and nanny, Dunya. This story tells the tale of Morozko, the frost king. Once the children have fallen asleep, Marina makes her way to her bedroom where she informs her husband, Pyotr, that she is once again pregnant. This poses an issue to the family because Marina is not expected to live through another pregnancy. However, she is determined to see through the birth of her fifth child because she can sense that this daughter will have powers that Marina's mother is believed to have had. To her family's grief, she indeed dies in childbirth, and her daughter is named Vasilisa, nicknamed Vasya. 

As Vasya grows older, she begins to spend more time in the forest. However, while she is exploring one day, she comes across an unusual tree that she does not recognise. At the foot of this tree lies a man with a missing eye. Before he can take an interest in her, another strange man on a horse arrives warning Vasya to leave and instructing the one-eyed man to go back to sleep because it is still winter. Vasya gets lost in the woods and is found by her older brother Sasha who is out with the search party looking for her. Once Sasha and Vasya return home, Sasha warns his father that Vasya needs a mother to look after and raise her. Pytor takes on this advice and travels to Moscow, taking Kolya and Sasha with him.

While in Moscow, Sasha meets a local monk who makes a good impression and returns to ask his father if he can leave and spend his time at the Christian monastery. Pyotr makes a deal with his son that he can only go if he agrees to stay at home for one more year so that he is sure of his decision and not swayed by the monk. Pyotr is also successful in finding a wife for himself. The Grand Prince of Moscow, Ivan II, presents his young daughter, Anna Ivanovna, to Pyotr. Anna also has the ability to see mythological creatures, however is convinced that they are devils and that she is being punished by God. As a result, there are whispers from others living in the castle that she is either a witch or crazy, so the Grand Prince sees this as a way to get her out of the public eye.

After making their way back to Lesnaya Zemlya, Pyotr also informs his daughter Olga of his success in finding her a husband in Moscow and that Anna is now their step mother. Once Anna realises that Vasya can also see the creatures, but is not afraid of them, she becomes convinced that Vasya is a witch on the side of evil and when the new, young and handsome priest, Konstantin Nikonovich, arrives they plan to ensure that every individual in Lesnaya Zemlya is convinced of Christianity and turns their backs on folklore and traditions of leaving offerings for little creatures believed to be safe guarding their village from the evil bear, Medved. However, in doing this, the creatures soon disappear as their offerings deplete and Lesnaya Zemlya is left defenseless. Meanwhile, Medved has been released and has convinced Konstantin that he is the voice of God. Konstantin, convinced that God is giving him his orders directly, agrees to Medved's demands to sacrifice a witch. While Pyotr is away, Konstantin and Anna hatch a plan to send Vasya to a convent by convincing the village people that she is a witch. However, in the midst of all the madness that arises, Vasya escapes into the forest, where she is taken under the wing of Morozko, the frost demon, who then reveals that he is the brother of Medved and is tasked with keeping him locked up for as long as he can. While in the care of Morozko, Vasya meets Solovey, an intelligent horse, with whom she bonds.

Meanwhile, Medved has realised that Vasya has been taken in by Morozko and convinces Konstantin to persuade Anna to follow him into the forest. Once he does this, Medved reveals himself to Konstantin as the evil bear and kills Anna, wholly resolving him of his shackles. Despite this, Pyotr appears in the forest and offers himself to Medved in place of Vasya. This sacrifice once again bounds Medved, returning him to endless slumber beneath the unusual tree. As the novel concludes, Vasya convinces her brother, Alyosha, that she must leave and allow him to establish himself as a man among men and that her presence will only affect him negatively, being a witch-woman. She and Solovey ride into the forest and she finds Morozko in his home.

Major characters 

 Vasya Petrovna: a young girl who is able to see the spirits that lurk within her home and village. She possesses the powers to battle the evil bear, Medved, and ensure that her home remains safe from his grasp.
 Morozko: the winter demon and the brother of Medved. He takes in Vasya when she escapes from Konstantin and Anna and helps her realise her potential while aiding her in her battle with Medved.
 Medved: the one-eyed man that is seen chained to a tree when Vasya was a little girl. He is also the brother of Morozko and the beast that is trying to destroy the world.
 Pyotr Vladimirovich: a Russian Boyar and the father of Vasya. He marries Ivan II’s daughter, Anna Ivanovna, in order to bring home a woman who can raise Vasya into becoming a respectable woman. He ultimately sacrifices his life during the battle between Vasya and Medved to ensure that she lives.
 Anna Ivanovna: the daughter of Ivan II and the second wife of Pyotr Vladimirovich. She also has the ability to see the spirits, however, believes them to be demons. Anna also creates the plan with Konstantin to send Vasya to a convent while Pyotr is away. This mimics the Slavic story of Morozko. She is ultimately slayed by Medved, acting as the sacrifice needed to loosen his shackles.
 Konstantin Nikonovich: the handsome young priest that is sent to Lesnaya Zemlya as a deterrent for an early revolution. He is quickly able to gain the attention and trust of the citizens of Lesnaya Zemlya and scares them into ending their sacrifices to the spirits that guard their homes. He is also led astray by Medved, who comes to him as the voice of God, to carry out his bidding.

Background 

The Bear and the Nightingale is Arden's debut novel and was published in January 2017 by Del Rey Books. Arden completed her diploma in French and Russian literature before moving to Hawaii for 6 months while writing her novel. Her fascination with Russian literature and history prompted her to write a novel that was set in medieval Russia. According to Arden, her appeal with this subject stems from a young age. In an interview with CNET she revealed that she had read Russian fairytales as a child.

The novel tackles issues such as gender and women's roles. Being set in medieval Russia, Arden challenges these issues in her novel and this is noted in her interview with BookPage as Ping states, “Vasya is a truly compelling heroine. She is strong enough to embrace her differences, but she still reads as a woman of her time”. Arden confirms this and explains her difficulty in balancing what she believed was right and what her character believed was right in medieval Russia.

Arden also weaves a mix of Russian folklore and Slavic mythology into the narrative. She tells the tale of the intertwining but conflicting beliefs of tradition and religion by incorporating characters such as the ambitious priest, Konstantin Nikonovich and enchanting fairy-tale creatures. Vasya is used as a medium to explore the interactions between these opposing philosophies. These creatures include:
 Domovoy: the household spirit who lives within the boundaries of the household. In the novel, the domovoi is depicted as the guardian of the home, placated with food offerings in return for protection. 

 Rusalka: a water spirit that can be found around lakes. They come in the form of women and their aim is mainly to entice men. In the novel, the rusalka is the first creature to warn Vasya of the priest's danger to the way of life of the villagers.
 Leshy: forest spirits who hide in tall grass and enjoy playing tricks on people wading through forests.
 Bannik: bathhouse spirits. The bannik in the bathhouse where Anna Ivanovna lived before marrying Pyotr would scare her so much she would refuse to bathe for weeks at a time until she was forced by her stepmother.
 Dvorovoi: the household yard spirit. The dvorovoi spend their time in the stables and yards of houses. The dvorovoi play a significant role in the novel by warning Vasya of their fleeting time left due to the depleting offerings left by the villagers.
 Vodianoy: a male water spirit. They are vengeful creatures who enjoy drowning people. They are typically considered the male version of rusalkas.
When asked why she incorporated so many myths and legends into her novel Arden responded, “Slavic paganism never really disappeared from the Russian countryside after the arrival of Christianity; rather they coexisted, with some friction, for centuries. I was fascinated by the tensions inherent in such a system”.

Publication 
The Bear and the Nightingale was released in early January 2017, followed by the sequel The Girl in the Tower, which was released in December 2017. The final novel of the series, The Winter of the Witch, was released in January 2019. The series is being published by Del Rey, an imprint of Penguin Random House Company. The Bear and the Nightingale was awarded Amazon's Best Science Fiction and Fantasy of 2017 and nominated for Goodreads Choice Awards Best Fantasy 2017 and Goodreads Choice Awards Best Debut Goodreads Author 2017.

The Bear and the Nightingale has also been published in paperback, hardcover, ebook and audio editions. Official translations include Bulgarian, Dutch, Polish, Portuguese, Serbian, Croatian, Hungarian, Persian, Spanish, Turkish, Chinese, Czech and Russian.

Reception 
The Bear and the Nightingale has been received positively by critics and reviewers. Publishers Weekly wrote that “the stunning prose (“The blood flung itself out to Vasya’s skin until she could feel every stirring in the air”) forms a fully immersive, unusual, and exciting fairy tale that will enchant readers from the first page". In a starred review, Kirkus commented on how the story was a "fairy tale [..] grounded in the realities of daily life in the time period", and that "even minor characters are given their own sets of longings and fears and impact the trajectory of the story". Everdeen Mason of The Washington Post said:

"The novel is deceptively simple, but its characters and plot are sophisticated and complex. Arden explores what happens when fear and ignorance whip people into a furor, and how society can be persuaded to act against its own interests so easily.”

Some critics were disappointed with the later chapters of the book. In an otherwise glowing review, fantasy writer and critic Amal El-Mohtar finds fault in the book's conclusion, for a "mishmash of affect and style, and an ending that undercuts much of its former power." Similarly, writer and book reviewer Caitlyn Paxson finds that "plot decisions and character developments veer down the path of least resistance" in the end of a book she would still "happily recommend."

The Bear and the Nightingale was a finalist for the 2018 Locus Award for Best First Novel, and Arden received nominations for the John W. Campbell Award for Best New Writer in 2018 and 2019. The Winternight trilogy was a finalist for the Hugo Award for Best Series in 2020.

References 

Fantasy novel series
American fantasy novels
Historical fantasy novels
Young adult fantasy novels
2017 fantasy novels
Slavic mythology in popular culture
Del Rey books